This article is a list of events in the year 2017 in Burkina Faso.

Incumbents
 President: Roch Marc Christian Kaboré 
 Prime Minister: Paul Kaba Thieba

Events
13 August – The 2017 Ouagadougou attack.

Deaths
30 May – Valère Somé, politician, scholar and revolutionary leader (b. 1950).
19 August – Salif Diallo, politician (b. 1957)

References

 
2010s in Burkina Faso
Years of the 21st century in Burkina Faso
Burkina Faso 
Burkina Faso